Nisakabad may refer to:
 Nisakabad, Bukan
 Nisakabad, Sardasht